The 1994 NCAA Women's Golf Championships were contested at the 13th annual NCAA-sanctioned golf tournament to determine the individual and team national champions of women's collegiate golf in the United States. Until 1996, the NCAA would hold just one annual women's golf championship for all programs across Division I, Division II, and Division III.

The tournament was held at the Eugene Country Club in Eugene, Oregon.

Defending champions Arizona State won the team championship, the Sun Devils' third.

Emilee Klein, from Arizona State, won the individual title.

Individual results

Individual champion
 Emilee Klein, Arizona State (286, −6)

Team leaderboard

 DC = Defending champion
 Debut appearance

References

NCAA Women's Golf Championship
Golf in Oregon
NCAA Women's Golf Championship
NCAA Women's Golf Championship
NCAA Women's Golf Championship